Albul may refer to:

Albul River, river in Romania

People with the surname
Anatoly Albul (1936–2013), Russian sport wrestler